Eugene C. Mooney (born January 16, 1943) was an American politician in the state of Florida.

Mooney was born in Winter Park, and attended the University of Florida, earning a Bachelor of Science degree. He served in the Florida House of Representatives for the 38th district from 1970 to 1972 and the 33rd district from 1972 to 1974, as a Republican. He lives in Altamonte Springs.

References

Living people
1943 births
Republican Party members of the Florida House of Representatives
University of Florida alumni
People from Orlando, Florida
People from Winter Park, Florida